Epicephala vermiformis is a moth of the family Gracillariidae. It is known from Java, Indonesia.

The larvae feed on Cajanus cajan. They probably mine the leaves of their host plant.

References

Epicephala
Moths described in 1936